Jeanne-Renée de Bombelles, Marquise de Travanet (3 May 1753 – 4 May 1828) was a French composer and poet who is best remembered today for the French folk song Pauvre Jacques.

Early life 
Travanet's parents were Henri Francois de Bombelles, the Comte de Bombelles, and Genevieve Charlotte de Badains. She had two half siblings from her father's earlier marriage (Marie and Joseph), and three full siblings (Marc, Alexandre, and Henriette).

Biography 
She was a lady-in-waiting to Louis XVI's sister Elizabeth before marrying the Marquis de Travanet in November 1779. They later divorced.

Travanet composed the music for Pauvre Jacques. Some sources indicate that she also wrote the words. Other sources attribute the words to a member of the royal family, possibly Marie Antoinette, or Louis XVI's sister Elizabeth.

Pauvre Jacques lyrics 

I did not feel my misery;
But now that you live far from me
I miss everything on earth.
When you came to share my work,
I found my task light,
Do you remember it? every day was beautiful.
Who will make this time prosperous for me?
When the sun shines on our huts,
I cannot endure its light:
And when I am in the shade of the forests.
I blame the whole of nature.
Poor Jacques, when I was near you,
I did not feel my misery;
But now that you live far from me
I lack everything on earth.

Travanet composed two volumes of Romances et Chansons, avec accompaniment de pianoforte ou le harpe. (O) (JAY) Individual songs by Travanet are included in many collections.

Download free sheet music by Travanet

Listen to Pauvre Jacques

References 

French composers
French women composers
1753 births
1828 deaths
Folk songs